Hugh Usher Tighe (b Castletowndevlin 27 February 1802  – d Newtownstewart 11 August 1874) was a Dean of the Church of England.

He was educated at Corpus Christi College, Oxford and ordained deacon in 1826 and priest in 1827. He began his ecclesiastical career with a curacy at Longbridge Deverill. After this he was the Rector of Clonmore then a Chaplain to Thomas de Grey, 2nd Earl de Grey, Lord Lieutenant of Ireland.

References

1802 births
1874 deaths
Alumni of Corpus Christi College, Oxford
Irish Anglicans
Deans of Leighlin
Deans of the Chapel Royal, Dublin
Deans of Ardagh
Deans of Derry